The 2013 Uzbekistan First League was the 22nd season of 2nd level football in Uzbekistan since independence in 1992. It is split in an Eastern and Western zone, each featuring 12 teams.

Teams and locations

Competition format
League consists of two regional groups: conference "East" and "West". The season comprises two phases. The first phase consists of a regular home-and-away schedule: each team plays the other teams twice. 
The top eight teams of the first phase from each zone will be merged in one tournament and compete for the championship.  The bottom four teams of each zone after first phase will play each other to remain in first league.

The draw of the 2013 season was held on 14 March 2013. First League joined Sherdor-Presstizh, Spartak Bukhoro, Alanga Qarshi, Istiqlol Toshkent, Hotira-79 and Lokomotiv BFK.

On 22 March 2013, Uzbek PFL authority announced that FK Khiva and Neftchi Tinchlik are replaced by Bunyodkor-2 and Bukhoro-2 because of lack of the financial support. Bunyodkor-2 to play in East zone and Bukhoro-2 in West zone.

First phase

Zone "East"

Top goalscorers

Zone "West"

Top goalscorers

Second phase

Championship group

Table before start
League table before start of second phase of championship. The matches of second round start on 11–12 August 2013

League table
In 2nd, championship phase Istiqlol Tashkent replaced FK Yangiyer in the tournament.

Final standings, updated: 28 October 2013
Source: Soccerway

Top goalscorers

References

External links
pfl.uz: First league results

Uzbekistan Pro League seasons
2
Uzbek
Uzbek